Metal on Metal is a 1982 album by Anvil, and the title song.

Metal on Metal may also refer to:

"Metal on Metal" (song), a song by Kraftwerk from their 1977 album Trans-Europe Express
Metal on Metal, a heavy metal radio show on WJCU Cleveland, Ohio hosted by Bill Peters since its debut in 1982
A violation of the rule of tincture